Gilandeh (also Romanized as Gīlāndeh and Gīlān Deh; also known as Gīlāndeh-e Yeylāq, Kalandeh, and Kalandekh) is a village in Kharajgil Rural District, Asalem District, Talesh County, Gilan Province, Iran. At the 2006 census, its population was 152, in 31 families.

References 

Populated places in Talesh County